Koll is a surname. Notable people with the surname include:

Adi Koll (born 1976), Israeli politician
Bill Koll (1923–2003), American sport wrestler
Claudia Koll (born 1965), Italian actress
Dominik Koll (born 1984), Austrian swimmer
Heinz Koll, Namibian rugby union player
Manuel Koll (born 1987), Austrian figure skater
Reena Koll (born 1996), Estonian pole vaulter
Richard Koll (1897–1963), German Wehrmacht general
Rob Koll, American sport wrestler and coach
Theo Koll (born 1958), German journalist

See also
Koll Rock, Antarctica
KOLL, radio station in Arkansas, United States
Kol (disambiguation)